The 2011 Saskatchewan Scotties Tournament of Hearts was the 2011 Saskatchewan provincial women's curling championship, held January 26–30 at the Jim Kook Recreation Complex in Outlook, Saskatchewan, Canada. The winning team of Amber Holland represented Saskatchewan at the 2011 Scotties Tournament of Hearts in Charlottetown, Prince Edward Island.  Holland's team finished the round robin in first place at 9-2, going onto the 1-2 page playoff game, where they lost to team Canada. The team went on to the Semi-Final game, where they defeated Ontario moving on to the final. The team met Jennifer Jones and Team Canada once again, where in the 10th end of play, score tied, Canada with last rock,  would steal the win, becoming the first Saskatchewan Team to win the Scotties since 1997, when Sandra Schmirler won her final Scotties, before dying of cancer. Amber Holland and team with returned to the 2012 Scotties Tournament of Hearts as defending champions Team Canada.

Teams

Standings Pool A

Standings Pool B

Results

Draw 1
January 26, 2:00 PM CT

Draw 2
January 26, 7:30 PM CT

Draw 3
January 27, 10:00 AM CT

Draw 4
January 27, 2:30 PM CT

Draw 5
January 27, 7:30 PM CT

Draw 6
January 28, 10:00 AM CT

Draw 7
January 28, 7:00 PM CT

Draw 8
January 29, 9:00 AM CT

TieBreaker
January 29, 2:00 PM CT

Playoffs

A1 vs. B1
January 29, 7:30 PM CT

A2 vs. B2
January 29, 8:00 PM CT

Semifinal
January 30, 1:00 PM CT

Final
January 30, 5:00 PM CT

Northern Qualification
The Northern Qualification round for the 2011 Saskatchewan Tournament of Hearts will take place January 13-16 at the Tisdale Curling Club in Tisdale, Saskatchewan. The format of play shall be an open-entry triple knockout qualifying four teams to the Provincial playoffs at the  Jim Kook Recreation Complex in Outlook, Saskatchewan, January 26-30 2011.

Teams

Results

A Event

B Event

C Event

Southern Qualification

The Southern Qualification round for the 2011 Saskatchewan Tournament of Hearts will take place January 13-16 at the Assiniboia Curling Club in Assiniboia, Saskatchewan. The format of play shall be an open-entry triple knockout qualifying four teams to the Provincial playoffs at the  Jim Kook Recreation Complex in Outlook, Saskatchewan, January 26-30 2011.

Teams

Results

A Event

B Event

C event

References

Saskatchewan Scotties Tournament Of Hearts, 2011
Saskatchewan
Saskatchewan Scotties Tournament Of Hearts
Curling in Saskatchewan